Jenin   is a village in the administrative district of Gmina Bogdaniec, within Gorzów County, Lubusz Voivodeship in western Poland.

The village has a population of 1,100.

References

Jenin